Theatre Terrific, also known as the Theatre Terrific Society, is a Canadian disability theatre company based in Vancouver, British Columbia. It is western Canada's oldest disability theatre company.

History 
In 1984, Connie Hargrave began to conceive of a theatre company focussed on disabled performers. Theatre Terrific was officially founded in 1985 and was one of Canada's first mixed-ability theatre companies. At this time, Sue Lister was hired as an instructor. Their first show, a musical revue by Leonard Angel titled Dancing on the Head of a Pin with a Mouse in my Pocket, was performed at the 1986 Vancouver Fringe Festival.

Theatre Terrific launched their outreach program, Direct Access, in 1987. The program was a student-focussed performance group whose ensemble members had graduated from Lister's training program. In 1988, Theatre Terrific launched a touring group composed of both abled and disabled actors. They toured across the province of British Columbia, performing at schools.

In the early 1990s, Theatre Terrific began to receive international attention. They official gained membership with the Vancouver Professional Theatre Alliance in 1992.

In 1994, the company appointed its first official artistic director: Jamie Norris. Sue Lister left Theatre Terrific in 1995. Norris left in 1998 and was replaced by co-artistic directors Elaine Avila and Trevor Found. Avila and Found focussed on artistic education before resigning in 2000. In 2001, Liesl Lafferty became Theatre Terrific's artistic director. The company had not been active for over one year preceding Lafferty's appointment. She resigned in November 2004.

Susanna Uchatius became artistic director in 2005, at which point the company shifted away from explicitly disability-centred themes. As artistic director, Uchatius has produced some of her own plays, including Hello in 2019, which focussed on the untold story of Arthur Miller's son, Daniel.

Artistic directors 

 Jamie Norris (1994–1998)
 Elaine Avila and Trevor Found (1998–2000)
 Liesl Lafferty (2001–2004)
 Susanna Uchatius (2005–present)

Production history 

 Dancing on the Head of a Pin with a Mouse in my Pocket by Leonard Angel (1986)
One on One (1988)
Syllabub by Kico Gonzalez-Risso (touring 1991)
Good-Looking Friends by John Lazarus (touring 1992)
Breeding Doubts by Sandra Ferens (1995)
Scraping the Surface by Lyle Victor Albert (1996)
Ring of Fire by Margaret Hollingsworth (touring 1996)
Step Right Up by Elaine Avila and Trevor Found (1999)
Spiralling Within by Siobhan McCarthy (2003)
Jumpin' Jack by Lyle Victor Albert (2004)
Error of Eros' Arrows (2004)
Ugly (2005)
slowrunning (2006)
Workin''' (2007)
 doGs by Susanna Uchatius in collaboration with the cast (2007)The Glass Box (2008)The Secret Son  (2009)
 dirty white by Susanna Uchatius (2010)
 I Love Mondays by Susanna Uchatius (2015)
 The Ridiculous Darkness by Wolfram Lotz - with Alley Theatre and Neworld Theatre (2017)
 Hello by Susanna Uchatius (2019)
 Digital Fracture: VOICES (2020)WINDOWS (2021 - online production)

 Awards 

 Notable performers 

 Jan Derbyshire (doGs'' - 2007)

References 

Disability theatre
Organizations based in Vancouver
Theatre in Vancouver
Theatre companies in British Columbia
1985 establishments in Canada